Novy Amzibash (Yañı Ämzebaş) is a rural locality (a village) in Amzibashevsky Selsoviet, Kaltasinsky District, Bashkortostan, Russia. The population was 11 as of 2010. There is 1 street.

Geography 
Novy Amzibash is located 22 km northwest of Kaltasy (the district's administrative centre) by road. Verkhny Tykhtem is the nearest rural locality.

References 

Rural localities in Kaltasinsky District